George Goeddeke (born July 29, 1945) was a college and professional offensive lineman in the 1960s and 1970s.  He played collegiately at Notre Dame, and professionally with the Denver Broncos in the American Football League (AFL) and the National Football League (NFL).  He was an AFL All-Star in AFL.

See also
Other American Football League players

References

1945 births
Living people
Players of American football from Detroit
American football offensive guards
Notre Dame Fighting Irish football players
Denver Broncos (AFL) players
Denver Broncos players
American Football League All-Star players